Farrer may refer to

People
 Alisha Farrer (born 1943), Australian actress and model
 Austin Farrer (1904–1968), English theologian, philosopher, and friend of C. S. Lewis
 Buster Farrer (1936-), South African cricketer
 Claude Farrer (1862–1890), English tennis player
 Frances Farrer (1895–1977),  General Secretary of the Women's Institute
 Henry Farrer (1844–1903), English-born American artist
 Joe Farrer (born 1962), member of the Arkansas House of Representatives
 Josie Farrer (born 1947), member for the Western Australian Legislative Assembly seat of Kimberley
 Julia Farrer (born 1950), English artist
 Leslie Farrer  (1900–1984), British solicitor
 Matthew Farrer (born 1929), British solicitor
 Matthew Farrer (footballer) (1852–1928), English amateur footballer who appeared in the 1875 and 1876 FA Cup Finals
 Reginald Farrer (1880–1920), pioneering English botanist
 Thomas Farrer, 1st Baron Farrer (1819–1899), English statistician
 Thomas Charles Farrer (1838–1891), English-born painter who worked in the United States
 Walter Farrer (1862–1934), British Church of England priest, most notably Archdeacon of Wells
 William Farrer (1845–1906), Australian agricultural scientist

Other uses
 Farrer, Australian Capital Territory, a suburb of Canberra, Australia, named for William Farrer
 Farrer & Co, a London law firm
 Division of Farrer, also named after William Farrer, is an electorate of the Australian House of Representatives in rural New South Wales
 Farrer hypothesis, a biblical theory
 Farrer Hall, a residential college at Monash University
 Farrer Memorial Agricultural High School, an agricultural school for boys near Tamworth, New South Wales, Australia

See also 
 
 Farrier (disambiguation)
 Baron Farrer (the Farrer Baronets)
 Farrar (disambiguation)
 Farrer family tree, showing the relationship between some of the above